South Carolina Highway 333 (SC 333) is a  primary state highway in the U.S. state of South Carolina. It serves as a connector highway between the towns of Scotia and Furman.

Route description
SC 333 is a two-lane rural highway that connects U.S. Route 321 (US 321) and US 601. It branches off of US 321 in the town of Scotia, only to terminate about  later at the intersection with US 601 in the town of Furman.

History

Established in 1949 as a resurrection, it follows the first SC 333 established in 1939, running then as is now. The first SC 333 did extend from its routing in 1940 west to Shirley then southeast to Garnett. In 1948, the route was decommissioned. When resurrected, it still left behind Augusta Stage Coach Road (S-25-20), Shirley Road (S-25-25), Stafford Road (S-25-26) and S-25-17.

Major intersections

See also

References

External links

 
 SC 333 at Virginia Highways' South Carolina Highways Annex

333
Transportation in Hampton County, South Carolina